Yu Jiaxin (born March 26, 1998 in Inner Mongolia) is a Chinese female curler from Changchun. She currently plays lead for the Chinese National Women's Curling Team.

Career
Yu was the alternate for the Chinese team at the 2018 World Junior Curling Championships where they won the bronze medal. She also was the alternate on the Chinese team skipped by Han Yu at the 2019 Pacific-Asia Curling Championships. They placed third after the round robin before defeating South Korea's Gim Un-chi in the semifinal and Japan's Seina Nakajima in the final.

Teams

Women's

Mixed doubles

References

External links

 Yu Jiaxin - Curling World Cup profile
 Video: 

Living people
Chinese female curlers
Pacific-Asian curling champions
1998 births
Sportspeople from Inner Mongolia
Sportspeople from Changchun
21st-century Chinese women